Hacran Dias (born 16 May 1984) is a Brazilian mixed martial artist who formerly competed in the featherweight division of the Ultimate Fighting Championship. He is ranked #5 in the ACA lightweight rankings. In 2015, Dias was the #9 featherweight in the world by Sherdog.

Mixed martial arts career

Background and training 
Hacran Dias is a part of the Nova Uniao fight team. Over his career Dias has fought in the lightweight division primarily in Shooto Brazil and M-1 Challenge. During this span, Dias amassed a record of 20 wins, one loss, and one draw. Noted primarily for his methodical approach to grappling, Dias also trains with noted fighters José Aldo, Renan Barão and Marlon Sandro.

The Ultimate Fighter: Brazil 

In January 2012 it was revealed Dias was one of 300 first-stage applicants for The Ultimate Fighter: Brazil.

Ultimate Fighting Championship 
In April, it was announced that Dias had skipped over the show and signed a three-fight deal with the UFC.

In his UFC debut, Dias faced Iuri Alcântara on 23 June 2012 at UFC 147 and won the fight via unanimous decision.

Dias was expected to face Chad Mendes on 15 December 2012 at UFC on FX 6.  However just days before the event, Dias pulled out of the bout citing a shoulder injury and was replaced by promotional newcomer Yaotzin Meza.

Dias was expected to face Manvel Gamburyan on 18 May 2013 at UFC on FX 8.  However, Gamburyan was forced to pull out of the bout citing another injury and was replaced by Nik Lentz Dias lost the back-and-forth fight via unanimous decision.

Dias was expected to face Rodrigo Damm on 9 October 2013 at UFC Fight Night 29.  However, the bout was scrapped just days prior to the event after Damm was sidelined due to a kidney stone attack.

Dias was expected to face Tatsuya Kawajiri on 4 January 2014 at UFC Fight Night 34.  However, Dias pulled out of the bout citing an injury.

After over a year away from the sport, Dias returned to face Ricardo Lamas on 28 June 2014 at UFC Fight Night 44. He lost the fight via unanimous decision.

Dias faced Darren Elkins on 20 December 2014 at UFC Fight Night 58. Dias won the fight by unanimous decision.

Dias was expected to face Chas Skelly on 27 June 2015 at UFC Fight Night 70.  However, Skelly was pulled from the card due to illness and replaced by Levan Makashvili. Dias won the fight via split decision.

Dias next faced Cub Swanson on 16 April 2016 at UFC on Fox 19. Dias lost the fight via unanimous decision.

Dias was expected to face Brian Ortega on 1 October 2016 at UFC Fight Night 96. However, Ortega pulled out of the fight in early September and was replaced by Andre Fili. He lost the fight via unanimous decision.

Dias faced Jared Gordon in the Lightweight bout on 28 October 2017 at UFC Fight Night: Brunson vs. Machida. He lost the fight via unanimous decision.

Dias was released from the UFC on 15 November 2017.

Shooto Brazil

After being released in late 2017, Dias faced to headline Shooto Brazil 84 against Mauricio Machado on 26 May 2018. He won the bout via first round armbar.

Absolute Championship Akhmat
Dias made his promotion debut for Absolute Championship Akhmat against Ustarmagomed Gadzhidaudov on 16 March 2019 at ACA 93: Balaev vs Zhamaldaev. He won the bout via unanimous. 

Dias faced Amirkhan Adaev on 9 April 2021 at ACA 121: Dipchikov vs. Gasanov. He won via unanimous decision. 

Dias faced Abdul-Aziz Abdulvakhabov for the ACA Lightweight Championship on November 5, 2021 at ACA 131: Abdulvakhabov vs. Dias. He lost the close bout via split decision.

Dias faced Yusuf Raisov in the Quarter-finals of the ACA Lightweight Grand Prix at ACA 138 on March 27, 2022. He lost the bout via unanimous decision.

Dias faced Aurel Pîrtea on December 16, 2022, at ACA 149. He won the bout via unanimous decision.

Dias faced Mukhamed Kokov for the Interim ACA Lightweight Championship on March 17, 2023 at ACA 154: Vakhaev vs Goncharov, winning the bout and belt via unanimous decision.

Mixed martial arts record

|-
|Loss
|align=center|27–9–1
|Mukhamed Kokov
|Decision (unanimous)
|ACA 154: Vakhaev vs Goncharov
|
|align=center|5
|align=center|5:00
|Krasnodar, Russia
|
|-
| Win
|align=center|
|Aurel Pîrtea
|Decision (unanimous)
|ACA 149: Vagaev vs Slipenko
|
|align=center|3
|align=center|5:00
|Moscow, Russia
|
|-
| Loss
| align=center| 
|Yusuf Raisov
| Decision (unanimous)
|ACA 138: Vagaev vs Gadzhidaudov
|
| align=center| 5
| align=center|5:00
|Grozny, Russia
|
|-
| Loss
| align=center| 
| Abdul-Aziz Abdulvakhabov
| Decision (split)
| ACA 131: Abdulvakhabov vs. Dias 
| 
| align=center| 5
| align=center|5:00
| Moscow, Russia
|
|-
| Win
| align=center| 
| Amirkhan Adaev
| Decision (unanimous)
| ACA 121: Dipchikov vs. Gasanov 
| 
| align=center|3 
| align=center|5:00 
| Minsk, Belarus
|
|-
| Win
| align=center| 
| Ustarmagomed Gadzhidaudov
| Decision (unanimous)
| ACA 93: Balaev vs Zhamaldaev 
| 
| align=center| 3
| align=center| 5:00
| St. Petersburg, Russia
|
|-
|Win
|align=center|24–6–1
|Mauricio Machado
|Submission (armbar)
|Shooto Brazil 84
|
|align=center| 1
|align=center| 3:58
|Rio de Janeiro, Brazil
|
|-
|Loss
|align=center|23–6–1
|Jared Gordon
| Decision (unanimous)
|UFC Fight Night: Brunson vs. Machida
|
|align=center| 3
|align=center| 5:00
|São Paulo, Brazil
|
|-
|Loss
|align=center|23–5–1 
|Andre Fili
| Decision (unanimous)
|UFC Fight Night: Lineker vs. Dodson
|
|align=center| 3
|align=center| 5:00
|Portland, Oregon, United States
|
|-
|Loss
|align=center|23–4–1
|Cub Swanson
|Decision (unanimous)
|UFC on Fox: Teixeira vs. Evans
|
|align=center|3
|align=center|5:00
|Tampa, Florida, United States
|
|- 
| Win
| align=center| 23–3–1
| Levan Makashvili
| Decision (split)
| UFC Fight Night: Machida vs. Romero
| 
| align=center| 3
| align=center| 5:00
| Hollywood, Florida, United States
|
|- 
| Win
| align=center| 22–3–1
| Darren Elkins
| Decision (unanimous)
| UFC Fight Night: Machida vs. Dollaway
| 
| align=center| 3
| align=center| 5:00
| Barueri, Brazil
| 
|-
| Loss
| align=center| 21–3–1
| Ricardo Lamas
| Decision (unanimous)
| UFC Fight Night: Swanson vs. Stephens
| 
| align=center| 3
| align=center| 5:00
| San Antonio, Texas, United States
| 
|-
| Loss
| align=center| 21–2–1
| Nik Lentz
| Decision (unanimous)
| UFC on FX: Belfort vs. Rockhold
| 
| align=center| 3
| align=center| 5:00
| Jaraguá do Sul, Brazil
| 
|-
| Win
| align=center| 21–1–1
| Iuri Alcântara
| Decision (unanimous)
| UFC 147
| 
| align=center| 3
| align=center| 5:00
| Belo Horizonte, Brazil
|
|-
| Win
| align=center| 20–1–1
| Paulo Dantas
| Submission (arm-triangle choke)
| Shooto Brazil 27
| 
| align=center| 2
| align=center| N/A
| Brasília, Brazil
| 
|-
| Win
| align=center| 19–1–1
| Eddie Hoch
| Submission (rear-naked choke)
| Shooto Brazil 25 - Fight for BOPE
| 
| align=center| 1
| align=center| 3:25
| Rio de Janeiro, Brazil
| 
|-
| Win
| align=center| 18–1–1
| Elieni Silva
| Decision (unanimous)
| Shooto Brazil 22
| 
| align=center| 3
| align=center| 5:00
| Brasília, Brazil
| 
|-
| Win
| align=center| 17–1–1
| Arielson Silva
| Submission (rear-naked choke)
| Shooto Brazil 21
| 
| align=center| 1
| align=center| 3:17
| Rio de Janeiro, Brazil
| 
|-
| Win
| align=center| 16–1–1
| Cesario di Domenico
| TKO (punches)
| Shooto Brazil 17
| 
| align=center| 2
| align=center| 3:07
| Rio de Janeiro, Brazil
| 
|-
| Win
| align=center| 15–1–1
| Cyldemar Cyldemar
| TKO (punches)
| Dojo Combat 1
| 
| align=center| 1
| align=center| N/A
| Juiz de Fora, Brazil
| 
|-
| Win
| align=center| 14–1–1
| César Cunha
| Decision (unanimous)
| Brazil Fight
| 
| align=center| 3
| align=center| 5:00
| Belo Horizonte, Brazil
| 
|-
| Win
| align=center| 13–1–1
| Sidney Lessa
| Submission (rear-naked choke)
| Shooto Brazil 14
| 
| align=center| 1
| align=center| 3:30
| Rio de Janeiro, Brazil
| 
|-
| Loss
| align=center| 12–1–1
| Yui Chul Nam
| Decision (unanimous)
| M-1 Challenge 17: Korea
| 
| align=center| 3
| align=center| 5:00
| Seoul, South Korea
| 
|-
| Win
| align=center| 12–0–1
| Amirkhan Mazihov
| Submission (rear-naked choke)
| M-1 Challenge 15: Brazil
| 
| align=center| 1
| align=center| 3:58
| São Paulo, Brazil
| 
|-
| Win
| align=center| 11–0–1
| Marcos dos Santos
| Decision (split)
| Santos Fight Festival
| 
| align=center| 3
| align=center| 5:00
| Santos, Brazil
| 
|-
| Win
| align=center| 10–0–1
| Marcio Soares
| Decision (split)
| WOCS 2
| 
| align=center| 3
| align=center| 5:00
| Rio de Janeiro, Brazil
| 
|-
| Win
| align=center| 9–0–1
| Rodrigo Ruiz
| Decision (unanimous)
| Jungle Fight 11
| 
| align=center| 3
| align=center| 5:00
| Rio de Janeiro, Brazil
| 
|-
| Draw
| align=center| 8–0–1
| Takafumi Ito
| Draw
| Pancrase: Shining 2
| 
| align=center| 3
| align=center| 5:00
| Tokyo, Japan
| 
|-
| Win
| align=center| 8–0
| Alan Nilson
| Decision
| Mo Team League 2
| 
| align=center| 3
| align=center| 5:00
| São Paulo, Brazil
| 
|-
| Win
| align=center| 7–0
| Willamy Freire
| Decision (unanimous)
| Shooto Brazil 3 - The Evolution
| 
| align=center| 3
| align=center| 5:00
| Rio de Janeiro, Brazil
| 
|-
| Win
| align=center| 6–0
| Leonardo Nogueira
| Submission (choke) 
| Juiz de Fora Fight 4
| 
| align=center| 2
| align=center| 0:55
| Juiz de Fora, Brazil
| 
|-
| Win
| align=center| 5–0
| Gustavo Careca
| TKO (retirement)
| Shooto Brazil 2
| 
| align=center| 1
| align=center| 5:00
| Rio de Janeiro, Brazil
| 
|-
| Win
| align=center| 4–0
| Ronirley Souza
| Decision (unanimous)
| MMA Kombat Espirito Santo
| 
| align=center| 3
| align=center| 5:00
| Vila Velha, Brazil
| 
|-
| Win
| align=center| 3–0
| Aldenir Paraiba
| Submission (armbar)
| Juiz de Fora Fight 3
| 
| align=center| 2
| align=center| N/A
| Juiz de Fora, Brazil
| 
|-
| Win
| align=center| 2–0
| Alex Cobra
| Submission (choke)
| Real Fight Combat
| 
| align=center| 2
| align=center| N/A
| São José dos Campos, Brazil
| 
|-
| Win
| align=center| 1–0
| Roberto Romanoni
| Submission (triangle choke)
| Real Fight Combat
| 
| align=center| 1
| align=center| N/A
| São José dos Campos, Brazil
|

See also
 List of male mixed martial artists

References

External links
 
 

1984 births
Living people
Brazilian male mixed martial artists
Brazilian practitioners of Brazilian jiu-jitsu
Featherweight mixed martial artists
Lightweight mixed martial artists
Mixed martial artists utilizing Brazilian jiu-jitsu
Ultimate Fighting Championship male fighters
Sportspeople from Rio de Janeiro (city)
People awarded a black belt in Brazilian jiu-jitsu